Cubillas may refer to:

Cubillas de Cerrato, a municipality in the province of Palencia, Castile and León, Spain
Cubillas de los Oteros, a municipality in the province of León, Castile and León, Spain
Cubillas de Rueda, a municipality in the province of León, Castile and León, Spain
Cubillas de Santa Marta, a municipality in the province of Valladolid, Castile and León, Spain
Joel Cubillas (born 1958), a former football defender
Teófilo Cubillas (born 1949), a Peruvian former footballer